This is a list of fictional characters that have appeared in BBC One's science fiction/police procedural drama, Life on Mars.

Main characters

Sam Tyler

Gene Hunt

Annie Cartwright

Ray Carling

Chris Skelton

1973 characters

Derek and Ted Bannister

Ted Bannister (John Henshaw) appeared in episode three as a trade union organiser who is fighting to keep the factory where he works in business, despite its probable closure. The character is introduced when a corpse is found in the factory and the death is assumed to be murder. Later it transpires that the dead man was killed by faulty machinery, and Ted concealed the circumstances of the death to prop up the factory's reputation.

Later in the episode, Ted's son Derek (Andrew Knott) is arrested for armed robbery, after organising a payroll snatch at the factory.

Pete Bond
Pete Bond (Anthony Flanagan) is a Manchester United supporter and a regular at the Trafford Arms. He tried to beat up Colin Clay, a fellow supporter, and blame it on Manchester City fans to start a massive brawl between the two sides fans on derby day. Unfortunately, Colin accidentally died, forcing Sam to track Pete down and arrest him.

Phyllis Dobbs 
WPC Phyllis Dobbs (Noreen Kershaw) is the station desk/custody officer, supervising the cells and mentoring WPC Annie Cartwright, with whom she forms a friendship.  Phyllis is regarded by other characters as "one of the lads" and socialises with them in the pub after work which is the "male domain".  In a time of social upheaval and women being treated as inferiors to men, Phyllis's no-nonsense attitude earns respect with the male fraternity because they know that, whatever rank they are, she won't tolerate their disrespect.  She encourages Sam to act on his feelings toward Annie.

Dicky Fingers
Richard "Dicky Fingers" Hands (Steve Evets) appeared in episode two of the second series and is introduced when Chris, Ray and Sam are sent to escort him from prison back to Manchester for questioning. During the transfer they are forced off of the road and held at gunpoint while the gunmen kidnap Dicky. It later transpires that the rescue was organised by corrupt police officer Harry Woolf.

Terry Haslam
Terry Haslam is a boxing manager who has a history with Gene Hunt. He beat up retired boxer Davie Mackie and blackmailed Hunt not to report it. However, Hunt did report it and took Haslam. Haslam was found innocent and Gene threatened to kill him. The next day Haslam is found dead and it is revealed that he had bet on Davie Mackie's last boxing match, telling Davie to throw the fight. Davie resisted, killing Haslam.

Leslie Johns
Leslie Johns (Sean Gilder) is a miner and an infamous cop killer. He organises the robbery of a train with a group of miners unaware Gene is undercover as one of the miners. The robbery seems to be going smoothly (Johns is unaware the train's staff are members of CID) but then Sam's radio goes off giving them up as police officers. When Annie, Chris, Ray and Gene run after Sam, Johns shoots Gene, Chris and Ray causing them to fall to the floor. When Sam returns from 2006 he shoots Johns dead as he is about to execute Gene.

Billy Kemble

Billy Kemble (Kevin Knapman) is arrested during episode seven for flashing his genitals in public and is investigated on suspected drug dealing. While in police custody, DS Ray Carling, assisted by DC Chris Skelton, force Kemble to eat cocaine, in the hope Kemble would reveal his supplier. Kemble has a heart attack, and dies in police custody. DCI Gene Hunt covers up the death to save all concerned from certain dismissal, but temporarily demotes Carling to Detective Constable, stating that the incident was "shameful" and that it was never to be repeated.

Derek Litton
Detective Chief Inspector Derek Litton, QPM (Lee Ross) is the Detective Chief Inspector (DCI) of the Regional Crime Squad. He and DCI Gene Hunt have a long-standing rivalry that festers into hatred of each other. The two departments fight after Gene and Detective Inspector Sam Tyler recover firearms stolen by factory workers, a job that falls under Litton's department. Later, in a hostage situation, Litton and Gene must work together to stop the hostages being killed. However, Litton's methods threaten Sam's and his own life, when Gene kicks him in the stomach and drops him out of the fire zone, proceeding to take a bullet which was blocked by one of his many hip flasks. Litton returns in Ashes to Ashes along with DI Geoffrey "Geoff" Bevan (Nicholas Gleaves), hunting comedian Frank Hardwicke (Roy Hudd) on suspicion of having robbed a police widows' benefit fund (in reality, Hardwicke had witnessed Bevan killing a young black man). Litton was awarded the Queen's Police Medal (distinguished service) some time in the intervening decade, flaunting it to Gene's detectives in Ashes to Ashes.

Frank Miller

Frank Miller (Peter Wight) appears in episode three of the second series as an owner of a local building site. It later transpires that he planted bombs around Manchester, thought to be placed by the Irish Republican Army, to distract the police while he broke into a bank.

Arnold Malone

Arnold Malone (Stephen Bent) is a longtime rival of Superintendent Harry Woolf. According to Woolf, Malone was responsible for a large amount of the crime rate in Manchester from the 1950s to the period of the show.  Woolf tries to frame Malone for the robberies Woolf has been committing but the evidence leads DI Sam Tyler, DCI Gene Hunt, and DC Glenn Fletcher to arrest Woolf.

Nelson
Nelson (Tony Marshall) is the barman at the Railways Arms where most of CID go to drink. Nelson gives much advice to Sam during his time in 1973, typically with double-meanings that seem to apply to both an issue at hand in 1973, and to Sam's overarching problem of being trapped in a dystopic 1973. He usually affects a thick Jamaican accent, although Nelson is actually from Manchester (like Marshall), and uses the accent because his customers seem to like him better as a foreigner than as a black local.

In the final year of the sequel series, Ashes to Ashes, Nelson's ghostly voice can be heard briefly in 1983 to DI Ray Carling, DC Chris Skelton and WPC Shaz Granger; Ray cannot quite place the voice, and Shaz never knew Nelson, but Chris recognises it and tells the other two. In the final act of the finale, after the characters have learned that they are dead souls in a CID purgatory, Nelson appears with a mystical version of the Railway Arms, suddenly in London. Still affecting the accent, he is an Odin or Saint Peter type figure who welcomes Ray, Chris, Shaz, and finally DI Alex Drake into a sort of policemen's Valhala or heaven: an eternal pub.

Until the finale, Nelson's counterpart in Ashes to Ashes is Luigi, the proprietor of the eponymous trattoria across the street from the team's police station in the Fenchurch East district of London, and the landlord of Alex Drake who resides in a flat above. Unlike Nelson, Luigi really is an immigrant, and he does not appear to share Nelson's special insight.

Nelson has two counterparts in the U.S. remake: a rarely seen bartender named Nelson (Mike Starr), and Sam's hippy (and possibly imaginary) neighbour, Windy (Tanya Fischer) who provides double-meaning insight to Sam.

Joni Newton

Joni Newton (Kelly Wenham) worked for local gangster Stephen Warren. She was a "honey trap" for Sam when he tried to go against Warren and take her into his care after purporting that she was going to be killed by him, where whilst she was in Sam's care she engaged in sex with him. 
She ended up going against Warren but was killed and her body was found on the canal.

Patrick O'Brien
Patrick O'Brien (Brendan Mackey) is an Irishman with a criminal record who was arrested by Gene for armed robbery. When dynamite goes missing at O'Brien's workplace he becomes the prime suspect in a spate of suspected IRA bombings. Gene is prejudiced against him because he is an ex-convict. This and his desire to avenge Ray cause Patrick to go on the run. Sam finds O'Brien and tells him he will find out who is really behind the bombs.

Frank Rathbone
Superintendent Frank Rathbone (William Hoyland) is the senior officer in overall command of both CID and uniform within the station. During episode 7 of the first series, DI Sam Tyler gives him a tape recording, proving that DS Ray Carling forced a prisoner to eat cocaine while in custody in the hope that it would get results out of him. Rathbone carelessly destroys the tape in front of Tyler without even bothering to hear its contents, satisfied that CID dealt with the matter internally and that there is no need for it to be taken further. Tyler feels let down by the corrupt Rathbone but accepts there is nothing else he can do.

Donald Sykes

Donald Sykes (Jack Deam) appears in episode eight of the second series, as a local criminal who is involved in a plot to rob a train with Leslie Johns. Sykes only gives up the plot after DCI Gene Hunt and DS Ray Carling savagely beat him up in the interrogation room.

Test Card Girl
The Test Card Girl (Rafaella Hutchinson in series one and Harriet Rogers in series two) is a young girl resembling the girl (Carole Hersee) in Test Card F, who appears as a vision to DI Sam Tyler. She often tells him things related to his current life, taunts Sam, and occasionally scares him greatly. For example, when he struggles with the stress of a failed bomb disposal, she appears to him showing her closed fists and chants "Red wire. Yellow wire. Red Wire. Yellow wire." When he fails to pick the correct hand she calmly says: "You're dead Sam. They're all dead because of you."

At the series finale, she is seen running down a street with other children: Turning to camera, she reaches to switch off the TV, and the image disappears as in an old television set.

In an interview with the Radio Times, Matthew Graham revealed the Test Card girl is constantly teasing and torturing Sam because she represents the devil in him. "But," he said, "there is another factor to consider. In 1973, when television transmission ceased for the night, when the story is done and the characters have vanished into nothing, the BBC would switch to the Test Card girl. So she, if you want to be melodramatic, represents the apocalypse, the end."

She has two counterparts in the sequel programme, Ashes to Ashes.  To the extent that she represents the devil and shuts off the Geneverse world, she foreshadows final series regular, DCI Jim Keats, a demon who obliterates the meticulously created Geneverse purgatory's façade, reveals the characters' prior deaths, and tempts them to come to hell. As a spectre who haunts the central protagonist, she and her clown doll, Bubbles, are akin to first series character the Clown Angel of Death who appears to terrorise DI Alex Drake and once frightens dying WPC Sharon Granger.

She has no direct counterpart in the U.S. remake.

Vic Tyler
Victor "Vic" Tyler (Lee Ingleby) is the father of Sam Tyler. Sam becomes convinced if he gets his father to stay with his mother then he can get back to 2006. However, he finds his father is behind some brutal gangland killings.

Adult Sam discovers to his horror the fleeting image he has throughout series 1, of a woman running in the woods in a red dress, is his memory of WPC Annie Cartwright chasing Vic at a family wedding and being brutally beaten by Vic. Adult Sam saves Annie from Vic but allows Vic to escape to protect his younger self from growing up the son of an imprisoned murderer.

Vic has a counterpart in the first series of Ashes to Ashes: Tim Price (Andrew Clover), father of series protagonist Alex Drake. Like Sam, Alex is haunted throughout series 1 by fragments of a memory from her youth, which she re-lives in the series 1 finale when she and her younger self both watch Tim kill himself and Alex's mother, Caroline (Amelia Bullmore).

His counterpart in the U.S. remake is Vic Tyler, portrayed by Dean Winters.

Stephen Warren
Stephen Warren (Tom Mannion) is a local gangster and owner of a nightclub, The Warren, who is paying the police, including Hunt, to turn a blind eye to his activities. He advises Sam Tyler not to go against him and implies that others have tried unsuccessfully; "others have tried to wear the white hat, and all have failed." After he murders one of his staff who helped out Sam, Gene Hunt decides to turn his back on corruption, and he and Sam come into his club and arrest him for murder.

His U.S. counterpart is Elliott Casso, portrayed by Robert Klein.

Harry Woolf

Detective Superintendent Harcourt "Harry" Woolf (Kevin McNally) is the most senior officer at the station. He was also Gene Hunt's DCI when Gene Hunt was a DI and sees a lot of Gene in DI Sam Tyler, respecting Sam's policing methods.  Woolf advises Gene to go by the book during the murder of George Rills in series 2, episode 1. Woolf is later revealed to be heavily corrupt, having masterminded a bank robbery to gain enough money to live out his last years before he dies of terminal cancer. Woolf planned to frame local gangster Arnold Malone for the robbery and had Dicky Fingers sprung from police escort for it. After Dicky reveals the truth about him to Tyler, Woolf releases him from his cell and has him executed. Despite Gene's loyalty to Woolf, he sees his corruption for what it is and attempts to arrest him. During the stand-off, Woolf is shot in the leg by Hunt and is subsequently held prisoner by an angry, betrayed DC Glenn Fletcher. Woolf loses everything, but Gene assures Sam that he won't let his old mentor die penniless and alone.

One of Lt. Gene Hunt's sporadically seen superiors in the American version is Chief of Detectives Harry Woolf (Fred Thompson); unlike in the original, Chief Woolf is not shown to be corrupt.

2006 characters

Alex Drake
Detective Inspector Alexandra "Alex" Drake (née Price) (unseen, subsequently portrayed by Keeley Hawes) is a police psychologist in London to whom DCI Sam Tyler posts debriefing tapes concerning his traumatic injury and the elaborate 1973 world he visited in his coma.  She is mentioned near the end of the finale of Life on Mars and is properly introduced in the opening scene of Ashes to Ashes, becoming the central protagonist of the latter programme.

Maya Roy
Detective Constable Maya Roy (Archie Panjabi), born in early 1974 in Manchester to Englishwoman Leslie Roy (alias Layla Dylan) and the late Deepak Gandhi, an Ugandan Asian immigrant, is Sam's girlfriend in 2006.  She is abducted by the suspect they are hunting at the beginning of the first episode; Sam is attempting to find her when he is struck by a car and transported back to 1973.  She escapes unharmed whilst he is comatose in 2006 and trapped in 1973.

Their relationship is already having difficulties before Sam's accident, and Maya ends it during the second series when it appears Sam will never recover. In the same episode, adult Sam meets Maya's pregnant mother Leslie, in 1973 and, in a predestination paradox, inspires her to name her baby Maya. Maya is, accordingly, approximately 4.5 years younger than Sam who is four in 1973.

Her counterpart in the US remake is Detective Maya Daniels, portrayed by Lisa Bonet.

2006 and 1973 characters

Tony Crane
Tony Crane (Marc Warren) was arrested by Sam in 2006 for the murder of his wife Eve. He manages to get to Sam's hospital room and attempts to kill him, but is arrested before he can do so.

In 1973, Crane runs a local casino and is Sam's prime suspect for the killing of a man on a bus. Gene doesn't believe Sam until Crane takes them both hostage. He is arrested after Annie uses a stinger ("invented" in 1973 by Sam, from his familiarity with them in the future) on his car in a chase, but there is not enough evidence to charge him. However, when Crane starts to make accusations of Sam's instability, citing the policeman's belief that he is a time traveller, Sam turns the tables by using this as proof of Crane's insanity. As a result, Crane is committed to a psychiatric hospital, where he remains for the next 33 years.

His U.S. counterpart is Tony Crane, portrayed by Chris Bowers. Sam arrested him for murdering his wife, Penny Margolise, in 2008 and Sam quickly suspected him of murdering a news reporter who had visited his gallery in 1973.

Layla Dylan
See Leslie Roy

Glenn Fletcher
DC/Supt/DCC Glenn Fletcher (Ray Emmet Brown) appears in episode two of the second series as a Detective Constable in 1973 and, in momentary flashes forward, as a Deputy Chief Constable in 2006. He was one of the Manchester and Salford Police's first black recruits at the start of the 1970s. In 1973, at only nineteen years of age, he is newly transferred to C Division CID as a detective constable. As the first black officer in the division, he experiences racist jokes and bullying from DS Ray Carling, to which Fletcher responds by agreeing with and making light of the racism. Sam encourages young DC Fletcher to assert himself and fight the racism which he's been tolerating.

In the intervening years, Fletcher rises through the ranks in Hyde. He becomes Sam Tyler's superintendent and mentor, and is the senior officer who has Sam promoted to Detective Chief Inspector. His 2006 self is shown wearing the ribbons of both the Queen Elizabeth II Golden Jubilee Medal and the Police Long Service and Good Conduct Medal. The first black person to hold the rank of Deputy Chief Constable in the Greater Manchester Police, he dies suddenly of a heart attack at his Chorlton home in 2006 at the age of 52, while Sam is in a coma. The character is based on 1970s comic Charlie Williams.

His counterpart in the U.S. remake is Detective/Captain Fletcher Bellow (Edi Gathegi).

Frank Morgan
DCI/Surgeon Frank Morgan (Ralph Brown) is a dual character, existing both in Sam's 2006 reality and his 1973 coma world.  Sam first sees him, as yet unidentified, in a momentary flash in episode 2.5. His two selves are introduced in episode 2.7 and appear in episode 2.8.  Sam is aware of both characters, and interprets the 1973 DCI Morgan to be an avatar of the 2006 surgeon Morgan. Many of DCI Morgan's statements to Sam are ambiguous, potentially referring to both Sam's 2006 medical condition and the 1973 police work.  The duality of Morgan's character is reminiscent of the 1939 MGM production of The Wizard of Oz. Frank Morgan was the name of the actor who played both Professor Marvel and the Wizard in that production, and Life on Mars included frequent allusions to the film.

Sam hears surgeon Frank Morgan explain that he is a specialist who has been called in to treat Sam's condition and bring him out of the coma; he tells Sam that the latter must fight to get back.

DCI Morgan subsequently arrives from C Division, Hyde, taking acting command of A Division, Manchester, when DCI Gene Hunt is suspended during the proceedings resulting from Hunt being accused of murdering a man.  Sam is impressed by DCI Morgan's modern, by-the-book, nature. Unlike Hunt and the others in 1973, Morgan records his interrogations. The manner in which he lays out his pens, notepad, inter alia, at the start of his interrogation of Gene echos Sam's actions in 2006 in episode 1.1. Morgan intends to remove Gene and modernise A Division. When Sam and Gene prove the latter's innocence, Morgan brings a bottle of liquor to CID's celebration and offers a "no hard feelings" truce which Gene accepts. In private, however, he tells Sam that bringing down Hunt will get Sam home (ostensibly back to Hyde; implicitly back to 2006). Morgan tells Sam that the latter is suffering amnesia from his injuries in ep. 1.1, is really named Sam Williams, and is undercover to expose the corruption of Gene Hunt and his team in "Operation MARS". Likening Sam's condition to a "waking coma" that Sam supposedly had after a coach crash in 1950 at the age of 12.  Morgan shows Sam the cemetery where his (Williams') parents are buried, adjacent to the 19th-century graves of Vic, Ruth, and Sam Tyler. Sam tells Morgan about Gene's dangerous sting operation to catch train robbers in the act.  Morgan instructs Sam to play along, ensuring him that a detachment of armed response officers will be in the railway tunnel to foil the robbery, protect Sam and his colleagues, and relieve Gene of duty permanently. When Sam runs into the tunnel during the robbery, however, Morgan informs him that there will be no armed response and he is cleaning house by letting Gene, DS Ray Carling, and DCs Chris Skelton and Annie Cartwright be killed.  He leads Sam into oblivion, assuring him that he is going home.

When Sam awakens in his 2006 hospital bed an instant later, he finds Mr Frank Morgan, surgeon, greeting him. Surgeon Morgan has operated on Sam to bring him out of his coma.  Sam's hospital room is in Hyde Ward.

In the US version, Frank Morgan is an FBI agent sent to the 125th Detective Squad to investigate an Irish gangster's murder and tries to frame Det. Sam Tyler, but Sam finds out that he murdered the gangster because he hijacked a truck of smuggled goods that Morgan had owned and is arrested by Lt. Gene Hunt.

Eve Olawi
Eve Olawi (Yasmin Bannerman) was killed by Tony Crane prior to Sam's coma. She dismisses his warnings in 1973 that she will have a terrible life with Crane.

Colin Raimes
Colin Raimes (Sam Hazeldine) is a suspected killer in 2006. Sam is convinced Colin was behind the 2006 crime but despite having written about killing in his diary, Raimes has a cast iron alibi. Maya suggests he might have known the killer. In 1973, Sam discovers that the true murderer in 2006 was Colin's neighbour, who was arrested in 1973 for a similar crime but released thirty years later.

His American counterpart shares the same name.

Leslie Roy
Leslie Roy (Alex Reid) is the bookkeeper and girlfriend of Deepak Gandhi. She has recently fallen pregnant with his child when he is killed in the summer of 1973. She identifies herself by the alias Layla Dylan when first questioned by the police. Investigating the crime is DI Sam Tyler who, unlike their contemporaries, does not look down upon Leslie's relationship with an Ugandan Asian immigrant, as he had loved the daughter of one himself. With Deepak dead, Leslie intends to abort their child but is talked out of doing so by Sam who, in a predestination paradox, inspires her to name her baby Maya.

In 2006 (unseen), Leslie does not particularly approve of her daughter's boyfriend and supervisor, DCI Sam Tyler. She would prefer that Maya would marry a physician or wealthy man rather than a police officer.

Ruth Tyler
Ruth Tyler (Joanne Froggatt in 1973 & Judi Jones in 2006) is the mother of Sam Tyler. Sam meets her whilst in 1973, incognito, improvising the name "Detective Inspector Bolan" when asked his name – he had spoken with musician Marc Bolan the previous evening. He meets her again when the CID deduces his father Vic might be involved with the Morton brothers.

In "The Good Father", when the truth about Vic's involvement in violent crime is discovered, Ruth tells the four-year-old Sammy that Vic had to go away.

Sam also speaks to Ruth when he returns to 2006, leaving Hunt and his team in 1973 in a mail train under fire from railway bandits. Without telling her the details, he says he promised someone he would return. She tells him she knows he won't let them down, because he always keeps his promises. This clears the way for his return to 1973.

Ruth is not mentioned in Ashes to Ashes. In some respects, Caroline Price (Amelia Bullmore) is an analogous character. Series protagonist DI Alex Drake reunites with her mother, Caroline, and visits her childhood home, as Sam had done. Caroline provides Alex advice on occasion. Like Ruth, Caroline is unaware that she is married to a murderer.

Her counterpart in the U.S. remake is Rose Tyler, portrayed by Jennifer Ferrin, and appears only in the 1973 world. The change of forename brought the Tyler surname full-circle. Series creator Matthew Graham's young daughter had given Sam the surname Tyler in homage to the companion on the newly re-launched Doctor Who, Rose Tyler.

References

Life on Mars
 
Characters, Life on Mars